Good Hope is an unincorporated community in Leake County, Mississippi, United States.

History
In 1900, the community was home to two churches and had a population of 100. A post office operated under the name Good Hope from 1854 to 1907. Good Hope was once home to the Good Hope Academy.

References

Unincorporated communities in Leake County, Mississippi
Unincorporated communities in Mississippi